Giada Galizi (born 20 July 1993) is an Italian freestyle swimmer. She was part of the freestyle 4×100 m teams that won a gold and a bronze medal at the 2014 European Aquatics Championships. Her mixed relay team set a European record in the process.

References

External links
 

1993 births
Living people
Swimmers from Rome
Italian female freestyle swimmers
Mediterranean Games gold medalists for Italy
Mediterranean Games medalists in swimming
Swimmers at the 2018 Mediterranean Games
Swimmers of Fiamme Oro
21st-century Italian women